Valemont is an American supernatural television miniseries on MTV that premiered on September 21, 2009. Two episodes premiered on Tuesdays during The Hills and The City. For six consecutive weeks, two and a half minute episodes of Valemont premiered in the commercial pods directly preceding The Hills and following The City. The concluding 23 episodes of the series (35 episodes in total for season 1) were made available online at MTV.com and on V Cast Video from Verizon Wireless, along with other bonus footage.

Description 
The show follows Maggie Gracen (Kristen Hager), who after visiting the morgue to help identify the supposed burnt body of her brother Eric (Eric Balfour), decides to infiltrate Valemont University, an exclusive, historic and secretive college in rural Massachusetts from where some of the world’s greatest leaders have graduated, that her brother attended before disappearing mysteriously.

Taking the identity of Sophie Fields (a student who turned down her acceptance to Valemont University due to pregnancy) so that her real identity won't be discovered, she delves deeper into the mystery of her brother's disappearance. On the surface Valemont is like any other University but something is different, something is strange, especially with the students. Some students are smart, some are athletic, some are strong, and some are vampires.

Each episode begins with a video clip or text message from Eric's mobile device. The phones provide viewers with clues to characters in the show, and through an online gaming experience at ValemontU.com. In addition, a five second Verizon Wireless billboard will close each new episode of Valemont, driving to additional exclusive content on V CAST.

The show also features music from Irish rock band Fight Like Apes.

Episodes

DVD Releases 
The whole of series 1 was released in the UK on 1 Nov 2010, on a 2 Disc R2 DVD.

See also
Vampire film
List of vampire television series

References

External links 
Official site

2000s American drama television series
2009 American television series debuts
2009 American television series endings
MTV original programming
Vampires in television
2000s American horror television series